Daulton Compton Jefferies (born August 2, 1995) is an American professional baseball pitcher in the Oakland Athletics organization. He played college baseball for the California Golden Bears. He was selected by the Athletics with the 37th overall pick of the 2016 Major League Baseball draft and he made his major league debut in 2020.

Career
Jefferies attended Buhach Colony High School in Atwater, California, where he both pitched and played shortstop. As a junior in high school, Jefferies was named the Most Valuable Player award in the Central California Conference after pitching to a 8–0 win–loss record with a 1.26 earned run average and putting up a .366/.480/.505 slash line. In Jefferies's senior season, he went 10-2 with a 0.92 earned run averge and a school-record 142 strikeouts, again taking home the conference's Most Valuable Player award. Jefferies had initially verbally committed to play baseball for Stanford University during the summer of his junior year of high school, but the offer fell through and Jefferies was forced to find another school, eventually deciding on the University of California, Berkeley.

As a freshman for the California Golden Bears in 2014, Jefferies started 15 games, finishing the year 2–8 with a 3.45 earned run average and 58 strikeouts in a team-high  innings. Jefferies' sophomore season saw both his record and earned run average improve, as he appeared in 14 games, starting 13, and went 6–5 with a 2.92 earned run average, enough to warrant a First Team All-Pac-12 selection. The summer after his sophomore season, Jefferies was a member of the USA Baseball Collegiate National Team, and played collegiate summer baseball with the Wareham Gatemen of the Cape Cod Baseball League.

Jefferies was drafted by the Oakland Athletics with the 37th overall pick of the 2016 Major League Baseball draft. He spent his first professional season with the AZL Athletics where he posted a 2.38 earned run average with 17 strikeouts in 11.1 innings pitched. He pitched in only two games for the Stockton Ports in 2017 before undergoing Tommy John surgery, thus ending his season. He appeared in one game in the AZL in 2018 as he continued to rehab his way back to full health. Jefferies split the 2019 season between Stockton and the Midland RockHounds, going a combined 2–2 with a 3.41 earned run average over 79 innings.

Jefferies was added to the Athletics 40–man roster following the 2019 season. Jefferies was called up as the extra man for a doubleheader on September 12, 2020 against the Texas Rangers. It was his major league debut but it did not go well as Jefferies only lasted two innings, giving up five runs on two home runs and taking the loss. 

On May 20, 2022, Jefferies was diagnosed with thoracic outlet syndrome, and was sidelined indefinitely. He was outrighted off the roster on November 14, 2022.

Pitching style
Jefferies has a four pitch repertoire. His fastball has a bit of sink and sits in the low-to-mid 90s, but can top out around 96 mph. His primary off-speed pitch is his changeup which he throws in the mid-80s with good sink and fade. He also has a decent slider and a good three-quarters curveball.

Personal life
Jefferies is the nephew of former major league pitcher Blas Minor, and his older brother Jake was a catcher in the minor leagues for both the Miami Marlins' and Tampa Bay Rays' organizations.

References

External links

Cal Golden Bears bio

1995 births
Living people
People from Merced, California
Baseball players from California
Major League Baseball pitchers
Oakland Athletics players
California Golden Bears baseball players
Wareham Gatemen players
Arizona League Athletics players
Stockton Ports players
Midland RockHounds players
Las Vegas Aviators players